Radiša Trajković  (born 27 January 1973), known by the stage name Đani, is a popular Serbian pop-folk singer. He was born in Lipljan and attended school there.

He is married to Slađana. He is stepfather to her son from her previous marriage.

Discography
Ulica je moj dom (1995)
Ta žena (1998)
Otišla si, e pa neka (2000)
Neka pati žena ta (2001)
Druga dva (2003)
Sam sam (2004)
Sve mi tvoje nedostaje (2005)
Balkanac (2007)
Još te sanjam (2010)

References

External links 
 Djani Klub muzičara profile

Living people
People from Lipljan
Serbian turbo-folk singers
Kosovan singers
Grand Production artists
1973 births